The discography of Carly Simon, an American singer-songwriter, memoirist, and children's author, consists of 23 studio albums, two live albums, nine compilation albums, one Christmas album, four soundtrack albums, one audiobook, and 41 singles, on Elektra Records, Warner Bros. Records, Epic Records, Arista Records, Rhino Entertainment, Columbia Records, Hear Music, and Iris Records, with special releases on Qwest Records, Angel Records, Walt Disney Records, and Macmillan Audio. These lists include all live and studio albums, and the motion picture soundtracks list includes albums containing more than 50% of music by Simon. 

In the United States, Simon has five Platinum-certified albums and three Gold-certified albums. In the United Kingdom, she has three Gold-certified albums and two Silver-certified albums. All but three of her studio albums have charted on the U.S. Billboard 200, with 12 charting in the Top 40, and five in the Top 10. Two of her compilation albums have also charted in the Top 40. Simon also has amassed 24 Billboard Hot 100 singles, with 13 of them hitting the Top 40, and 28 Billboard Adult Contemporary chart singles, all charting in the Top 40. Four of her singles have been certified Gold by the Recording Industry Association of America (RIAA): "You're So Vain", "Mockingbird" (with James Taylor), "Nobody Does It Better", and "Jesse". "You're So Vain" was certified Gold by the British Phonographic Industry (BPI), while "Nobody Does It Better" was certified Silver.

Recording history

1971–1979: Elektra years
Simon was signed by Jac Holzman to Elektra Records in 1970. She released her self-titled debut album in February 1971, and it won her the Grammy Award for Best New Artist. The album spawned her first Top 10 single, "That's the Way I've Always Heard It Should Be" (No. 10), which also earned her a Grammy Award nomination for Best Pop Vocal Performance, Female. Her second album, Anticipation, followed in November 1971 and yielded the successful singles "Anticipation" and "Legend in Your Own Time". Anticipation earned Simon another Grammy nomination in 1973 and was later certified Gold by the RIAA. In 1972, Simon achieved international fame following the release of her third album, No Secrets: it sat firmly at No. 1 on the Billboard 200 for five weeks, was certified Platinum, and spawned the No. 1 worldwide hit "You're So Vain", which went Gold, and the Top 20 hit "The Right Thing to Do". No Secrets earned four Grammy nominations in 1974, including three for "You're So Vain". Simon's fourth album, Hotcakes, was released that same year and became an instant hit: it went Gold and spawned the Top 10 singles "Mockingbird" (with James Taylor) and "Haven't Got Time for the Pain". Simon's fifth album, Playing Possum, appeared in 1975 and hit the Top 10. Its lead single, "Attitude Dancing", hit the Top 40, and the second second single, "Waterfall", quickly followed. Later that year, Simon released her first greatest hits collection, The Best of Carly Simon. It achieved Triple Platinum status in the United States and remains her best selling album to date.

In 1976, Simon released for sixth album, Another Passenger, to critical acclaim. The album spawned two singles: "It Keeps You Runnin'" and "Half a Chance". "Nobody Does It Better", from the James Bond film The Spy Who Loved Me, became a worldwide hit in 1977. The single hit No. 1 on the  Billboard Easy Listening chart, where it stayed for seven weeks, eventually becoming the No. 1 Adult Contemporary hit of the year. It went Gold and earned two Grammy nominations. Simon's seventh album, Boys in the Trees, was released the following year and spawned the hit singles "You Belong to Me" (which earned Simon another Grammy nomination) and "Devoted to You" (with James Taylor). The album was certified Platinum and won the Grammy Award for Best Album Package. Simon's eighth album and her last for Elektra Records, Spy, was released in 1979. Its lead single, "Vengeance", earned Simon a Grammy nomination for Best Rock Vocal Performance, Female in 1980, the first year to feature this category.

1980–1985: Warner Bros. and Epic years
Simon signed with Warner Bros. Records in 1980 and released her ninth studio album, Come Upstairs. The lead single, "Jesse", became a major hit: it remained on the Billboard Hot 100 singles chart for six months, peaking at No. 11, and went Gold. Also in 1980, Simon appeared in the documentary and concert film No Nukes, and it accompanying soundtrack album of the same name. The standards album Torch followed in 1981, and Hello Big Man followed in 1983, both to critical acclaim. In 1982, she hit the Top 10 in the U.K. with the Nile Rodgers & Bernard Edwards-produced single "Why", from the soundtrack album to the film Soup for One. She had another UK success (No. 17) with the single "Kissing with Confidence", a song from the 1983 album Dancing For Mental Health by Will Powers (a pseudonym for photographer Lynn Goldsmith). Simon was the uncredited lead singer. After her contract with Warner Bros. had ended, she signed with Epic Records and released Spoiled Girl in 1985. The album yielded two singles: "Tired of Being Blonde" and "My New Boyfriend", with only the former charting. The album was commercially unsuccessful and her contract with Epic was cancelled.

1986–2000: Arista years
In 1986, Simon signed with Arista Records and released Coming Around Again the following year. The album became a great success, and spawned four Top 10 Adult Contemporary singles: "Coming Around Again" (written for the film Heartburn), "Give Me All Night", "The Stuff That Dreams Are Made Of", and "All I Want Is You". It was certified Platinum, and earned Simon another Grammy nomination in 1988. Live from Martha's Vineyard was broadcast as an HBO special in 1987, and featured Simon performing a majority of the just released Coming Around Again album, as well as some of her classic hits. Greatest Hits Live was released the following year and went Platinum as well. "Let the River Run" was written for the film Working Girl in 1988, and Simon won the Academy Award for Best Original Song and the Golden Globe Award for Best Original Song in 1989, and the Grammy Award for Best Song Written for a Motion Picture, Television or Other Visual Media in 1990. Simon became the first artist to win this trio of awards for a song composed and written, as well as performed, entirely by a single artist. The Working Girl soundtrack album was released in August 1989 and featured more music from Simon.

In 1990, Simon released her second standards album My Romance, which was followed by the HBO special Carly in Concert – My Romance. Later that year, she released Have You Seen Me Lately, which yielded the major Top 10 Adult Contemporary hit "Better Not Tell Her", her biggest hit of the 1990s. She scored another Adult Contemporary hit in 1992 with "Love of My Life" (No. 16), written for the film This Is My Life, and featured on the soundtrack album which also includes more music from Simon. She was jointly commissioned by the Metropolitan Opera Association and the Kennedy Center in 1993 to write a contemporary opera that would appeal to younger people: Romulus Hunt: A Family Opera was the result and was released on Angel Records that year. Simon's 16th studio album, Letters Never Sent, was released in 1994. The album featured "Like a River" in honor of her mother, Andrea Simon, and "Touched By The Sun" for her dear friend, Jackie Onassis, both of whom died from cancer in 1994. Live at Grand Central was an unannounced concert recorded for Lifetime in 1995 and was broadcast later that year. It featured Simon performing a majority of the just released Letters Never Sent album, as well as some of her classic hits. The three-disc career retrospective Clouds in My Coffee was released that same year. Simon's third standards album, Film Noir,  was released in 1997. It featured duets with Jimmy Webb and John Travolta, and earned Simon a Grammy nomination for Best Traditional Pop Vocal Album. In 1998, the single-disc UK import The Very Best of Carly Simon: Nobody Does It Better was released. Simon's 20th studio album and her last for Arista Records, The Bedroom Tapes, was released on May 16, 2000, to near unanimous critical acclaim.

2001–present: Post-Arista releases
In 2001, Simon performed on "Son of a Gun" with Janet Jackson on Jackson's album All for You. The song was released as a single and peaked at No. 28 on the Billboard Hot 100. In 2002, Simon released her first Christmas album Christmas Is Almost Here, and the two-disc career retrospective Anthology. The single-disc Reflections: Carly Simon's Greatest Hits was released in 2004 to great commercial success: it peaked at No. 22 on the Billboard 200, remained on the chart for 19 weeks, and went Gold. In 2005, Simon signed with Columbia Records and released her fourth album of standards, Moonlight Serenade, which reached No. 7 on the Billboard 200, and earned Simon her 14th Grammy nomination the following year. In the fall of 2005, Simon performed two concerts on board the RMS Queen Mary 2. A Moonlight Serenade on the Queen Mary 2 was broadcast on various PBS stations that December and released on DVD. Simon performed with Andreas Vollenweider on four tracks for his 2006 holiday album, Midnight Clear.

Simon's fifth collection of covers, Into White, was released to critical acclaim in January 2007 and became Billboard's Hot Shot Debut, entering the chart at No. 15 and peaking at No. 13 in its second week. In April 2008, Simon released This Kind of Love, which debuted at No. 15 on the Billboard 200. It was her first album of original material since The Bedroom Tapes eight years earlier, and was released on the Starbucks label, Hear Music. In October 2009, Simon released Never Been Gone, an album of acoustic reworkings of some of her classic songs, which is her most recent studio album to date. In 2015, Songs From The Trees (A Musical Memoir Collection) was simultaneously released as a tie-in to Simon's autobiography, Boys in the Trees: A Memoir. The two-disc set contained two previously unreleased songs, "Showdown" (originally recorded during the sessions for her 1978 album Boys in the Trees) and "I Can't Thank You Enough", a brand new song written and performed with her son Ben Taylor.

Albums

Studio albums

Compilation albums

Live albums

Christmas albums

Soundtrack albums

Other albums

Audiobooks

Deluxe editions

Singles

Notes
  "Devoted to You" also peaked at No. 33 on the Billboard Hot Country Singles chart, and at No. 36 on the Cash Box Country chart.
  Simon sang uncredited co-lead vocals on "Kissing with Confidence".
  "Son of a Gun (I Betcha Think This Song Is About You)" also peaked at No. 26 on the Billboard Hot R&B/Hip-Hop Singles & Tracks chart and at No. 7 on the Billboard Hot Dance Club Play chart.

Video albums

Music videos

See also
List of awards and nominations received by Carly Simon

References

External links
Carly Simon's Official Website

Discography
Discographies of American artists
Pop music discographies
Rock music discographies